Omer Goldstein (born 13 August 1996 in Misgav) is an Israeli cyclist, who currently rides for UCI WorldTeam . His brother Roy Goldstein also competed professionally as a cyclist. In October 2020, he was named in the startlist for the 2020 Vuelta a España.

Major results
Source: 

2013
 1st  Road race, National Junior Road Championships
2015
 National Road Championships
2nd Under-23 time trial
3rd Time trial
4th Road race
2016
 National Road Championships
2nd Time trial
2nd Under-23 time trial
2017
 2nd Time trial, National Road Championships
2018
 National Road Championships
1st  Time trial
3rd Road race
2019
 2nd Road race, National Road Championships
2020
 1st  Road race, National Road Championships
2021
 1st  Time trial, National Road Championships
2022
 National Road Championships
1st  Time trial
3rd Road race
 9th Overall Tour de Wallonie

Grand Tour general classification results timeline

References

External links

1996 births
Living people
Israeli male cyclists
People from Northern District (Israel)